Marairazo (possibly from Quechua maray batan or grindstone; to tear down, to knock down, rasu snow, ice) is a mountain in the northern sector of the Huaytapallana mountain range in the Andes of Peru, about  high. It is situated in the Junín Region, Concepción Province, Comas District, and in the Jauja Province, in the districts of Apata and Monobamba.

References 

Mountains of Peru
Mountains of Junín Region